The 2014–15 Iowa State Cyclones women's basketball team represented Iowa State University in the 2014–15 NCAA Division I women's basketball season. This was head coach Bill Fennelly's 20th season at Iowa State. The Cyclones were members of the Big 12 Conference and played their home games at the Hilton Coliseum. They finished the season 18–13, 9–9 in Big 12 play for a four way tie to finish in third place. They lost in the quarterfinals of the Big 12 women's tournament to Oklahoma State. They received at-large bid of the NCAA women's basketball tournament where they lost to Dayton in the first round.

Radio
All Cyclones games were carried on the Iowa State Cyclone Radio Network. Not all affiliates carried women's basketball, and some affiliates only carried select games. To learn which stations will carry games, please visit the Cyclone Radio Network affiliate list linked here. Brent Blum and Molly Parrott called all the action for the Cyclone Radio Network and for games on Cyclones.tv.

Roster

Schedule and results

|-
!colspan=9 style="background:#FFD700; color:#C41E3A;"| Exhibition

|-
!colspan=9 style="background:#C41E3A; color:#FFD700;"| Non-conference Regular Season

|-
!colspan=9 style="background:#FFD700; color:#C41E3A;"| Conference Season

|-
!colspan=9 style="background:#C41E3A; color:#FFD700;"| 2015 Big 12 women's basketball tournament

|-
!colspan=9 style="background:#C41E3A; color:#FFD700;"|NCAA women's tournament

Rankings

See also
 2014–15 Iowa State Cyclones men's basketball team

References

Iowa State
Iowa State Cyclones women's basketball seasons
Iowa State
Iowa State Cyc
Iowa State Cyc